Hotinja Vas is a village in the Municipality of Hoče–Slivnica in northeastern Slovenia. It lies on the edge of the flatlands on the right bank of the Drava River south of Maribor. The area is part of the traditional region of Styria. The municipality is now included in the Drava Statistical Region.

The village chapel-shrine dates to 1921.

References

External links

Hotinja Vas on Geopedia

Populated places in the Municipality of Hoče-Slivnica